Dr. David Kearney is a fictional character on the New Zealand soap opera Shortland Street, who was portrayed by Peter Elliott from early 1996 to late 1999 and for a guest appearances in 2020 and 2022, where he returned for the show's 30th anniversary.

Creation and casting
Peter Elliott was cast in the role of David in 1995, with his first appearance airing in early 1996. Part of the intention of the characters introduction, was a future partnership with established character – Ellen Crozier (Robyn Malcolm), for what was to become, a cot death storyline. Elliott stated, "It’s an honour to be asked to join New Zealand’s most successful television drama .... It is a lovely challenge to play someone who is straightforward and charming because I’m so used to being the nasty guy." David arrived to screens with the producers intending to expand upon his family. He was said to have a "secret", which was later revealed to be a runaway homeless son. A minor character named Fergus (Paul Ellis), who had appeared in several episodes in late 1995, impressed producers and he was rewritten so as to be David's estranged son. Elliot was protective of his character and would change lines and object to storylines so as to best suit how he thought David would act. This led to a conflict with the production staff due to what Elliot believed was an inaccurate portrayal of men on the soap opera. He had a "worry that there was nothing on television that young males could see that was in any way a positive role model." In 1999, Elliott's contract was not renewed. He was "outraged" and "upset", but later was happy to have had the ability to work in other roles. Elliott believed himself to be "bitter and tired and worn out" at the time of the axing believing the he had left "under a bit of a cloud ... I felt the powers that be had betrayed me. I felt a bit sold out." The character made his last appearance alongside screen wife Ellen, in November 1999. Elliott reprised his role for cameos in 2020, and in May 2022 for the show's 30th anniversary. Several months later Elliott was invited back in an extended stint, debuting in November 2022 and believed due to his previous axing he had, "carried a lot of baggage around that for quite some time. That’s been largely healed by being invited back". He signed an initial contract until early 2023.

Storylines
David arrived as Jenny Harrison's (Maggie Harper) oncologist after her diagnosis of breast cancer. He developed an interest in the clinic and ended up buying Julia Thornton's (Elizabeth Hawthorne) shares and the management contract, placing him as the Clinic Director. He briefly dated Caroline Buxton (Tandi Wright) before he fell in love with Ellen Crozier (Robyn Malcolm) and the two moved in together. However the return of his ex-wife Isobel (Jennifer Ward-Lealand) saw Ellen flee to Fiji and when David followed her and they reconciled, she admitted she was pregnant.

The following year the two married and not long later, Ellen gave birth to Rose (Georgia Bishop). Rose died from cot death and when David discovered Ellen had cheated on him in grief, he too had an affair with Bridget Hastings (Katie Wolfe). However, as the year ended he realised he still loved Ellen but Bridget's diagnosis with a brain tumour led him to stay with her. In 1999 David and Ellen began an affair and Bridget soon left him. The happiness was short lived however when David was diagnosed with a rare disorder that would leave him blind. He retired and the couple decided to move to a lifestyle block in the Hawkes Bay. David and Ellen did not return for David's son Fergus' (Paul Ellis) wedding in 2001 as David was too ill.

In 2020 Boyd Rolleston (Sam Bunkall) was shocked to learn his mother Susan (Miranda Harcourt) and father were divorcing as Susan had been having an affair. Inviting the new man to his wedding, Boyd was introduced to David whom Susan was now in a partnership with. David returned in a documentary style reappearance in 2022 reminiscing on his time as head of the then private clinic he part owned.

Character development

Cot death storyline
In 1996, producers decided to have Shortland Street undergo a cot death storyline and the decision was made for the character of Ellen Crozier (Robyn Malcolm) to undergo it. Needing a suitable father character, writers paired Ellen with the relatively new character of David. Ellen and David had been dating for several months but the arrival of his ex-wife Isobel Kearney (Jennifer Ward-Lealand) lead to Ellen thinking the two had reconciled, causing her to flee to Fiji. In a specially shot episode in the country, David tracked her down and the two reconciled, only for Ellen to announce she was pregnant. The couple decided to marry to support the child and lured their friends to the ceremony under the pretense that it was Grace Kwan's (Lyentte Forday) birthday. Producers encountered a problem when developing the storyline, when they realized they had accidentally over run Ellen's pregnancy. A quick fill in story was devised where Ellen was nervous that the baby was so late. In the casting of Ellen and David's child, the daughter of the show's medical adviser was chosen. Having set the storyline up to unfold in 1998, crew members began to get cold feet due to the uneasiness of shooting the scene using one of their co workers own children and the fact that two of the storyliners had fallen pregnant. On screen, Ellen had an unscheduled birth, giving birth to Rose Crozier-Kearney (Georgia Bishop) in her bathroom, but help arrived in the form of Caroline Buxton (Tandi Wright) just in time. Due to the tenderness of the storyline, it was continuously pushed back until the stage where it was nearing the point of improbability. The plot was ultimately scheduled to air in the last possible week with the potential of cot death to occur. In February 1998, Ellen and David were shocked to discover her baby daughter Rose, had died in her sleep. The scene was shot with the baby's actress but Malcolm was directed to quickly pick her up and then the shot was changed to a close up, to avoid any movements from the child. The couple's devastation at Rose's death saw them break up and date other characters. However, over a year later they finally put Rose to rest and reconciled. The storyline landed Malcolm with her first ever television acting nomination. The subject of a child's death was dealt with once more in the soap, 5 years later in the death of Te Ngakau Hudson.

Reception
David was a popular character and his pairing with Ellen Crozier also proved hugely popular. The Crozier-Kearney family became one of the primary families throughout the nineties and fronted several "great" storylines. The death of David's daughter Rose, proved hugely iconic and is remembered as on the shows greatest moments. Elliott himself, did not enjoy the character of David and believed he was unrealistically weak and vulnerable and that the soap's female characters were in comparison stronger and wiser. The departure of David amongst several other core characters, saw a fall in the ratings for the soap and several measures were made to fix this, such as the reintroduction of Chris Warner (Michael Galvin).

References

Shortland Street characters
Television characters introduced in 1996
Fictional business executives
Male characters in television